Xiangyang Subdistrict is a subdistrict in Qinghe District, Tieling, Liaoning, China. , it has five residential communities, one village, and one industrial park community under its administration.

See also 
 List of township-level divisions of Liaoning

References 

Township-level divisions of Liaoning
Qinghe District, Tieling